C. Byre Gowda was an Indian senior legislator and cabinet minister of Karnataka, India. He was the Minister of Agriculture from 1996 to 1999 in the cabinet of Chief Minister J.H Patel.

C Byre Gowda represented the Vemgal Assembly segment for five consecutive terms. He was heading the All-India Progressive Janata Dal(AIPJD) faction. Gowda was a minister in three Janata Parivar Cabinets- those of Ramakrishna Hegde, H D Deve Gowda , and JH Patel. Originally from the CPI, Gowda has been an acknowledged expert on all agricultural matters and is known for his ability to talk extensively about farmers and their problems. He was a State President of Janata Dal (United) from 1999 to 2003.

Biography 
C Byre Gowda was married to Savithramma. His son, Krishna Byre Gowda, is also a politician and a member of the Legislative Assembly from the Byatarayanapura Constituency.

Death 
C Byre Gowda died on July 29, 2003, following a massive heart attack. He was 70.

References 

Karnataka MLAs 1983–1985
Karnataka MLAs 1985–1989
Karnataka MLAs 1989–1994
Karnataka MLAs 1994–1999
Karnataka MLAs 1999–2004
Agriculture Ministers of India
2003 deaths
Janata Dal politicians
Mysore MLAs 1972–1977